Jayden El-Jalkh, also known by the nickname of "Jack-in-the-box", is a Lebanon international rugby league footballer who plays as a er for the Western Suburbs Magpies in the NSW Cup.

Career
El-Jalkh made his international debut for Lebanon in their 56-14 defeat by Fiji in the 2019 Pacific Test.

References

External links
Lebanon Cedars profile

Lebanese rugby league players
Lebanon national rugby league team players
Rugby league wingers
Living people
1997 births